Kenneth ("Ken") Edward Robinson (born 16 November 1971 in Darwin, Northern Territory) is a retired field hockey player from New Zealand, who was a regular member of the men's national team, nicknamed The Black Sticks, during the 1990s and early 2000s (decade). Robinson earned a total number of 53 caps during his career.

References
NZ commonwealthgames
NZ caps

1971 births
Living people
New Zealand male field hockey players
1998 Men's Hockey World Cup players
Field hockey players at the 1998 Commonwealth Games
2002 Men's Hockey World Cup players
Commonwealth Games competitors for New Zealand